Vladimir Sladojević  (born 12 May 1984) is a Bosnian retired professional footballer who played as a forward. He played for Górnik Zabrze in the Polish Ekstraklasa, MFK Ružomberok in the Slovak Superliga and NK Drava in the Slovenian PrvaLiga.

References

1984 births
Living people
Sportspeople from Banja Luka
Serbs of Bosnia and Herzegovina
Bosnia and Herzegovina footballers
Association football forwards
Brescia Calcio players
Górnik Zabrze players
MFK Ružomberok players
NK Drava Ptuj players
NK Zadar players
I liga players
Slovak Super Liga players
Slovenian PrvaLiga players
Bosnia and Herzegovina expatriate footballers
Bosnia and Herzegovina expatriate sportspeople in Italy
Expatriate footballers in Italy
Bosnia and Herzegovina expatriate sportspeople in Poland
Expatriate footballers in Poland
Bosnia and Herzegovina expatriate sportspeople in Slovakia
Expatriate footballers in Slovakia
Bosnia and Herzegovina expatriate sportspeople in Slovenia
Expatriate footballers in Slovenia
Bosnia and Herzegovina expatriate sportspeople in Croatia
Expatriate footballers in Croatia